The Amphibian Ark (or AArk) is a joint effort of three principal partners: the World Association of Zoos and Aquariums (WAZA), the IUCN/SSC Conservation Breeding Specialist Group (CBSG), and the IUCN/SSC Amphibian Specialist Group (ASG).

The AArk was formed to address the ex situ components of the Amphibian Conservation Action Plan (ACAP). Its vision is the world's amphibians safe in nature, and its mission is ensuring the global survival of amphibians, focusing on those that cannot be safeguarded in nature.

Amphibian Ark staff coordinate ex situ amphibian programs implemented by partners around the world, with the first emphasis on programs within the range countries of the species, and with an obligation to couple ex situ conservation measures with protection or restoration of species in their natural habitats.

An AArk Steering Committee, with Executive Co-Chairs from each of the three principal partners, provide guidance on the activities of the AArk and ensure communication with stakeholders.

A number of dedicated positions coordinate implementation within the AArk initiative; assist AArk partners in priority taxa identifying and regions for ex situ conservation work; lead development and implementation of training programs for building capacity of individuals and institutions; and develop communications strategies, newsletters and other messages, and materials to promote understanding and action on behalf of amphibian conservation.

Advisory Committees have been formed to consult on species-specific issues, for example, reintroduction, gene banking, and veterinary, legal, and ethical concerns.

Members of the AArk are WAZA members and WAZA affiliates, members of regional or national zoo associations, Species360, AArk approved private partners and AArk approved museums, universities and wildlife agencies.

Although action to save critical species from immediate extinction will be to send them to facilities with space and expertise, the goal is to enable the range countries currently lacking facilities and expertise to care for their own species. This will allow outside experts to free up their time and space to begin the process anew with other species in other regions of the world.

See also
 Svalbard Global Seed Vault
National Ice Core Laboratory
Frozen zoo
Coral reef organizations
Rosetta Project

References

External links 
 

Animal conservation organizations
International organizations based in the United States
Herpetology organizations
Amphibian conservation organizations